The second season of the animated comedy television series Ed, Edd n Eddy, created by Danny Antonucci, originally aired on Cartoon Network from November 26, 1999, to December 22, 2000, and consists of 13 episodes. The series revolves around three adolescent boys collectively known as "the Eds", who live in a suburban cul-de-sac. Unofficially led by Eddy, the Eds frequently scheme to make money off their peers in order to purchase their favorite confection, jawbreakers. However, their plans usually fail, leaving them in various predicaments.

The first season was a success in Nielsen ratings, prompting Cartoon Network for a November 1999 premiere. While the first season itself received generally positive reviews, the second season proved to be an improvement in reception, garnering acclaim and earning two Leo Awards, while the first received one.

The Complete Second Season DVD was released in Region 1 in 2007. The Ed, Edd n Eddy DVD volume Edifying Ed-Ventures, also featured season two episodes. Both DVDs were published by Warner Home Video. Many Cartoon Network compilation DVDs featured episodes from the season. It can also be purchased from the iTunes Store. It was written by Antonucci, Jono Howard, Mike Kubat, and Robert Leighton.

Development

Concept
Ed, Edd n Eddy follows the lives of three adolescent boys who all share variations of the name Ed, but differ greatly in their personalities. In the pursuit of buying jawbreakers and fitting in with the other kids, dimwitted Ed and intellectual Double Dee aid the self-appointed leader, Eddy, in his plans to scam the other children in their cul-de-sac out of their money during a perpetual summer vacation; however problems always ensue. The other children mostly dislike or show indifference to the Eds, though they all share a common fear of the Kanker Sisters, a group of teenage girls who live in the nearby "Park n' Flush" trailer park. The series takes place mostly within the fictional town of Peach Creek, and new locations were rarely introduced.

Production and cast
Danny Antonucci, a cartoonist known for his edgy adult work such as Lupo the Butcher and The Brothers Grunt, was dared by someone to produce a children's cartoon. In 1996, Antonucci pitched Ed, Edd n Eddy, which he conceived while designing a commercial, to Cartoon Network and Nickelodeon. After Cartoon Network agreed to give Antonucci creative control over the show, the series went into production and premiered its first season on January 4, 1999.

According to Cartoon Network executive Linda Simensky, the first season did "remarkably well" in ratings ever since its premiere, becoming one of the top-rated series on the network and prompting Cartoon Network to quickly order a second season for a November 1999 premiere, making it one of four seasons which Ed, Edd n Eddy was set to run. Antonucci stated that change in the characters from the first to the second season is "very" noticeable, due to the amount of development they went through. Antonucci directed the season, and co-wrote the episodes with Jono Howard and Mike Kubat, although Robert Leighton was credited as a co-writer for "To Sir with Ed".

The cast mostly remained the same as in season one; Matt Hill, Samuel Vincent, and Tony Sampson were cast as Ed, Edd (Double D), and Eddy, David Paul Grove as Jonny 2x4, Keenan Christenson as Jimmy, Janyse Jaud as Sarah and Lee Kanker, Kathleen Barr as Kevin and Marie, Peter Kelamis as Rolf, and Erin Fitzgerald as May Kanker, but Tabitha St. Germain, the voice of Nazz, was replaced by Fitzgerald.

Reception

Reviews and accolades
The second season of Ed, Edd n Eddy was generally acclaimed by critics and marked an improvement in reception from the first season. In 2000, the season won Danny Antonucci the Leo Award for Best Director of an Animated Production. In 2001, Patric Caird was nominated for the Leo Award for Best Musical Score of an Animation Program or Series, for his work on the episode "Ed in a Halfshell".

In his review of The Complete Second Season DVD, David Cornelius of DVD Talk considered the Eds adolescent equivalents of The Three Stooges, believing: "The series revels in the sort of frantic, often gross humor kids love so much, and there's just enough oddball insanity at play to make adults giggle just as easily." Cornelius also concurred that the "animation is colorful and intentionally bizarre; bold lines forming the characters and backgrounds wiggle and morph in a delirious haze. This is animation that's, well, really animated."

Home media
Two Ed, Edd n Eddy DVDs which featured a number of season 2 episodes were released by Warner Home Video in Region 1 from 2005 to 2007. The DVD volume titled Edifying Ed-Ventures was released on May 10, 2005, featuring three season two episodes out of a total six. The Complete Second Season was released on April 24, 2007. Both DVDs can also be purchased on the Cartoon Network Shop. The season is also available for download on the iTunes Store. Selected episodes from the season were also featured on several Cartoon Network compilation DVDs.

Episodes

Home media

References

External links

Ed, Edd n Eddy seasons
1999 Canadian television seasons
2000 Canadian television seasons